Air Jamaica Express was an airline based in Kingston, Jamaica, which, before folding, operated as a subsidiary of Air Jamaica.  It operated domestic and inter-island scheduled flights and charter services.  The airline was established in 1973 as Jamaica Air Taxi, and later operated as Trans-Jamaican Airlines until it was taken over by business man Gordon "Butch" Stewart, who also controlled Air Jamaica in 1994.

When Air Jamaica was renationalized in December 2004, responsibility for Air Jamaica Express remained with Stewart and his organization.  The airline struggled financially and after attempts to reorganize and secure additional capital were unsuccessful, the airline ceased operations on October 14, 2005. The JQ code assigned by the IATA was later reassigned to Jetstar Airways.

Services 
In 2002, Air Jamaica Express served the following destinations:

Prior to Air Jamaica Express, predecessor air carrier Trans-Jamaican Airlines was operating ATR 42 turboprop service on a routing of Montego Bay - Kingston - Grand Cayman - Belize City, Belize - Cancun, Mexico twice a week in 1994.

Fleet 
In 2002, Air Jamaica Express was operating the following twin turboprop aircraft types:

The airline also previously operated Short 360 turboprop aircraft and Dornier 228 aircraft as well as the following STOL capable piston engine prop aircraft during its existence:
 Britten-Norman Islander
 Britten-Norman Trislander

In addition, predecessor air carrier Trans-Jamaican Airlines operated ATR 42 turboprop aircraft.

References

Defunct airlines of Jamaica
Airlines established in 1995
Airlines disestablished in 2005
Companies based in Kingston, Jamaica